The 2018–19 Tennessee Tech Golden Eagles men's basketball team represented Tennessee Technological University during the 2018–19 NCAA Division I men's basketball season. The Golden Eagles, led by eighth-year head coach Steve Payne, played their home games at the Eblen Center in Cookeville, Tennessee as members of the Ohio Valley Conference. They finished the season 8–23 overall, 4–14 in OVC play to finish in last place and missed the conference tournament.

On March 3, 2019, the school announced that Payne resigned after 8 seasons as Tennessee Tech head coach.

Previous season 
The Eagles finished the season 19–14, 10–8 in OVC play to finish in a tie for fifth place. They defeated SIU Edwardsville in the first round of the OVC tournament to advance to the quarterfinals where they lost to Jacksonville State.

Roster

Schedule and results

|-
!colspan=9 style=| Non-conference regular season

|-
!colspan=9 style=| Ohio Valley Conference regular season

Source

References

Tennessee Tech Golden Eagles men's basketball seasons
Tennessee Tech
Tennessee Tech Golden Eagles men's basketball
Tennessee Tech Golden Eagles men's basketball